Renate Maria Birnstein (born 17 November 1946) is a German composer, violinist and pianist. She was born in Hamburg, and studied at the Hochschule fur Musik with Diether de la Motte and György Ligeti, receiving her diploma in composition and piano in 1973.

After completing her studies, Birnstein took a position teaching at the Hochschule fur Musik in Hamburg. Birnstein won the 1983 Prix de Rome. Her music has been performed internationally.

Works
Birnstein composes for orchestra, theater, chamber ensemble, choral and piano performance. Selected works include:
'Villa Massimo
Imaginations for orchestra, 1972
Ich rufe an mit meiner Stimme, 1981
Octet for flute, clarinet, trombone, viola, cello and two percussionists, 1985
Pranto ocre for baritone and piano to the text of the Brazilian poet Paes Loureiro, 2003
Les horloge, theater work 
Les grains de sable, theater work

References

External links
List of works

1946 births
Living people
20th-century classical composers
German music educators
Women classical composers
German classical composers
German women composers
Musicians from Hamburg
20th-century German composers
Women music educators
20th-century women composers
20th-century German women